John M. York (January 29, 1878 – February 28, 1949) was a lawyer and jurist in California.  He most notably served as the Presiding Judge of the California Court of Appeals, Second Appellate District, Division 1 from 1937 to 1949.

Biography 
John York was born in 1878 in Berkeley, California.  He was the son of Waldo M. York, a Judge of the Los Angeles Superior Court.

York was educated at Throop Polytechnic Institute, now known as California Institute of Technology, and at the University of Virginia School of Law.  He was admitted to the California Bar on April 18, 1899.  From 18991912, York practiced law in private practice.  On January 6, 1913 he began his judicial career on the Los Angeles Superior Court.  On March 12, 1915, he was elected unanimously as the Presiding Judge of that court by the 18 judges of the court, replacing J. Perry Wood in that position.

York served on the LA Superior Court until 1926 when he was appointed by Friend Richardson to the California Court of Appeals, Second Appellate Division, Division 1.  He took up his Associate Justice position on January 6, 2013.

On October 7, 1937, York was appointed as the Presiding Justice of the California Court of Appeals, Second Appellate District, Division 1 by Governor Frank Merriam.  He served in this position until his death in 1949.

York served on the Judicial Council of California from 19441946.

References 

Judges of the California Courts of Appeal
20th-century American judges
20th-century American lawyers
University of Virginia School of Law alumni
California Institute of Technology alumni
1878 births
1949 deaths